Vampire Doll may refer to:
The Vampire Doll, a 1970 Japanese horror film directed by Michio Yamamoto
Vampire Doll: Guilt-Na-Zan, a 2003–2008 manga written and illustrated by Erika Kari